|}

The Gold Cup is a Group 1 flat horse race in Great Britain open to horses aged four years or older. It is run at Ascot over a distance of 2 miles 3 furlongs and 210 yards (4,014 metres), and it is scheduled to take place each year in June.

It is Britain's most prestigious event for "stayers" – horses which specialise in racing over long distances. It is traditionally held on the third day of the Royal Ascot meeting, which is known colloquially (but not officially) as Ladies' Day. Contrary to popular belief the actual title of the race does not include the word "Ascot".

History

The event was established in 1807, and it was originally open to horses aged three or older. The inaugural winner, Master Jackey, was awarded prize money of 100 guineas. The first race took place in the presence of King George III and Queen Charlotte.

The 1844 running was attended by Nicholas I of Russia, who was making a state visit to England. That year's winner was unnamed at the time of his victory, but he was given the name "The Emperor" in honour of the visiting monarch. In return Nicholas offered a new trophy for the race — the "Emperor's Plate" — and this became the title of the event for a short period. Its original name was restored after nine years, during the Crimean War.

It was taken by thieves on 18 June 1907. The theft was never solved, but a replacement was finished by August. Mark Twain, the American humorist, came to London about that time, and was much amused by the twin headlines appearing in The Times:

MARK TWAIN ARRIVES

ASCOT GOLD CUP STOLEN

The Gold Cup is the first leg of Britain's Stayers' Triple Crown, followed by the Goodwood Cup and the Doncaster Cup. The last horse to win all three races in the same year was Stradivarius in 2019.

The Gold Cup is one of three perpetual trophies at the Royal Ascot meeting, along with the Royal Hunt Cup and the Queen's Vase, which can be kept permanently by the winning owners. A number of horses have won it more than once, and the most successful is Yeats, who recorded his fourth victory in 2009.

Records
Most successful horse (4 wins):
 Yeats – 2006, 2007, 2008, 2009

Other multiple winners:

 Anticipation – 1816, 1819
 Bizarre – 1824, 1825
 Touchstone – 1836, 1837
 The Emperor – 1844, 1845
 The Hero – 1847, 1848
 Fisherman – 1858, 1859
 Isonomy – 1879, 1880
 The White Knight – 1907, 1908
 Prince Palatine – 1912, 1913
 Invershin – 1928, 1929
 Trimdon – 1931, 1932
 Fighting Charlie – 1965, 1966
 Sagaro – 1975, 1976, 1977
 Le Moss – 1979, 1980
 Ardross – 1981, 1982
 Gildoran – 1984, 1985
 Sadeem – 1988, 1989
 Drum Taps – 1992, 1993
 Kayf Tara – 1998, 2000
 Royal Rebel – 2001, 2002
 Stradivarius – 2018, 2019, 2020

Leading jockey (11 wins):
 Lester Piggott – Zarathustra (1957), Gladness (1958), Pandofell (1961), Twilight Alley (1963), Fighting Charlie (1965), Sagaro (1975, 1976, 1977), Le Moss (1979), Ardross (1981, 1982)

Leading trainer (8 wins):

 Aidan O'Brien – Yeats (2006, 2007, 2008, 2009), Fame and Glory (2011), Leading Light (2014), Order of St George (2016), Kyprios (2022)

Leading owner (8 wins): (includes part ownership)

 Sue Magnier – Yeats (2006, 2007, 2008, 2009), Fame and Glory (2011), Leading Light (2014), Order of St George (2016), Kyprios  (2022)

Winners

See also
 Horse racing in Great Britain
 List of British flat horse races

References

 Paris-Turf:
 Racing Post:

 galopp-sieger.de – Ascot Gold Cup.
 horseracingintfed.com – International Federation of Horseracing Authorities – Gold Cup (2018).
 pedigreequery.com – Ascot Gold Cup – Ascot.
 tbheritage.com – Ascot Gold Cup.
 
 YouTube Race Video https://www.youtube.com/playlist?list=PLfn5x2SD03q4TvYnBjgdsNth34if5VTOt

Flat races in Great Britain
Ascot Racecourse
Open long distance horse races
Recurring sporting events established in 1807
British Champions Series
June sporting events
1807 establishments in England